WCSO can refer to:

 the University of Cambridge Philharmonic Orchestra, formerly known as the "West Cambridge Symphony Orchestra"
 WCSO (FM), an FM radio station located in Columbus, Mississippi
 the Will County Sheriff's Office, the principal law enforcement agency that serves Will County, Illinois
WCSO, an AM radio station licensed to Springfield, Ohio that consolidated with an Akron, Ohio radio station in 1930 to form WGAR (AM), now WHKW